The Best of Brandy is the first greatest hits album by American singer Brandy. It was released on March 28, 2005 by Atlantic Records, completing her contract with the label after being signed since 1994. The album comprises nearly all of Norwood's 1994–2004 singles, compiling her first four studio albums Brandy (1994), Never Say Never (1998), Full Moon (2002) and Afrodisiac (2004), as well as songs she contributed to film soundtracks such as Waiting to Exhale (1995) and Set It Off (1996). While it features no original material, the album includes rare tracks such as a 1995 cover of Michael Jackson's "Rock with You", her international single "Another Day in Paradise" and the single remix of "U Don't Know Me (Like U Used To)".

The Best of Brandy received generally favorable reviews from critics, who noted the creativity of Norwood's back-catalog. It debuted at number 27 on the US Billboard 200, selling 26,000 units in its first week. Outside the United States, "Who Is She 2 U"–the second US single from Afrodisiac–was released as a single in support of The Best of Brandy.

Release
On November 1, 2004, four months after the release of Afrodisiac, her fourth studio album with Atlantic Records, Brandy's publicist Courtney Barnes announced that the singer had requested and was granted an unconditional release from her recording contract with the music label, her record company since 1994, as Norwood was at "a place where [she wants] some change in her life [and] wanted to move on" musically. Brandy was subsequently asked to complete her contract with the release of a greatest hits collection, a plan which she considered a true compliment and showcase for her development as a recording artist over ten years. "I'm really proud of it," Brandy said about the compilation album the following year. "When you get a chance to step back, you notice all these great things you've done and all these great people that you've worked with. The album is a celebration of me being in the industry for so long, and I'm still going." In addition, Norwood declared her satisfaction with the conclusion of her Atlantic era: "I just thought it was a great idea – to put 18 songs together of the best of everything that I’ve done made me feel really good. And also, it is giving me a reason to move on from everything I've done. I'm excited about putting it out and also putting it behind me."

Critical reception

The Best of Brandy received generally favorable reviews from music critics. Andy Kellman of AllMusic gave the compilation four and a half out of five stars and commented that "the disc is straightforward and rather thorough in its makeup, compiling almost all of Brandy's charting singles, [and] though the last two albums evidently didn't produce big singles, they're just as strong and fresh as the first two — so this set, unlike so many other anthologies from her contemporaries, hardly confirms dwindling creativity or popularity."  Thomas Inskeep from Stylus magazine commended that Norwood "helped soundtrack highs and lows, especially highs, with your so fresh/so clean stable of killer singles. Now that they’re collected like this, it’s like my own personal time capsule. Here’s to another decade, Brandy. As Aaliyah sang, you’re more than a woman, and the pop/R&B landscape is richer for your presence in it. Thanks." He gave the album an "A" rating.

In his review for Slant magazine, Sal Cinquemani criticized both Warner Music and Atlantic for "botching the promotion of her last studio album [Afrodisiac]" and Norwood's subsequent drop. He was however positive with the album's track lisiting, stating: "The collection is capped off with non-album tracks like the #2 hit "Sittin' Up in My Room" and covers of Michael Jackson's "Rock with You" and Phil Collins's "Another Day in Paradise", which, though it's not exactly a labor of love for Brandy's longtime label home, makes The Best of a must-have for the hardest-core Moesha fans." He rated the compilation three and a half out of five stars. Less enthusiastic, Chris Taylor from MusicOMH felt that album proved that Norwood was "a fine wine that has never quite fully matured [...]The overall result is a middling collection which ultimately leaves one frequently fast-forwarding, wondering what could have been."

Commercial performance
In the United States, The Best of Brandy debuted at number 27 on the Billboard 200 and number 11 on the Top R&B/Hip-Hop Albums chart, selling 26,000 units in its first week. It spent a total of five weeks on the Billboard 200. Internationally, the album entered the top thirty in Australia and the United Kingdom only, where it reached numbers 25 and 24 respectively, but enjoyed short runs on the charts. In addition, the album reached number 92 on the European Top 100 Albums chart. The album was certified silver by the British Phonographic Industry (BPI) in September 2019, for 60,000 units sold in the United Kingdom.

The album was released on vinyl for the first time on February 11, 2022. It charted in the UK on the Official Hip Hop and R&B albums Chart Top 40 at number 17 on February 18, 2022.

Track listing

Notes
 denotes additional producer
 denotes vocals producer

Personnel
Credits adapted from the liner notes of The Best of Brandy.

Dallas Austin – producer
Babyface – producer
Liz Barrett – project assistant
Marc Baptiste – photography
Mike City – producer
Phil Collins – composer
Keith Crouch – producer
Sara Cumings – art direction, design
LaShawn Daniels – composer
Ginger Dettman – project assistant
Malia Doss – project assistant
Mike Engstrom – product manager
Roger Erickson – cover photo, photography
Alan Fletcher – project assistant
David Foster – producer
Annaliese Harmon – project assistant
Dan Hersch – remastering
Jacqueline Hilliard – composer

Robin Hurley – project assistant
Bill Inglot – remastering
Fred Jerkins III – producer
Rodney Jerkins – producer
Kipper Jones – producer
Quincy Jones – producer
Johnny de Mairo – producer
Jonathan Mannion – photography
Mark McKenna – project assistant
Sonja Norwood – management
QDIII – producer
Ray J – performer
Guy Roche – producer
Timbaland – producer
Becky Wagner – project assistant
Kanye West – producer
Corey Williams – project assistant
Steve Woolard – project assistant

Charts

Certifications

Release history

See also
 Album era

Notes

References

External links
 Official website

2005 greatest hits albums
Albums produced by Dallas Austin
Albums produced by Rodney Jerkins
Albums produced by David Foster
Albums produced by Quincy Jones
Albums produced by Guy Roche
Brandy Norwood albums
Hip hop soul compilation albums
Contemporary R&B compilation albums
Pop compilation albums